The Lebanese Elite Cup is a Lebanese football annual cup competition contested by the top six teams of the previous Lebanese Premier League season. Founded in 1996 as the Super League Cup, the first edition was contested by the top five finishers of the league and the Lebanese FA Cup winners. The most successful club in the competition is Nejmeh with 12 titles, followed by Ahed with six.

History
The competition was first played in 1996 and was contested by the top five of the league and the Lebanese FA Cup winners; it was known as the Super League Cup. The following season it was known as the Super Cup and expanded to feature the top six teams of the previous season. From 1998 until 2002 it was known as the Viceroy Cup, and in 2003 it changed again to the Prime Cup, but has always been known locally as the Elite Cup, the current name of the competition. The competition was not played in 2006 and 2007, due to the 2006 Lebanon War.

Format
The top six placed teams from the previous Lebanese Premier League season are split into two groups of three. The first two placed teams in each group qualify to the knock-out stages, where two one-legged semi-finals are disputed. The two winners from the previous round play the final, with the winner being crowned champion of the competition.

Winners and finalists

Winners by year

Results by team

See also
 Lebanese FA Cup
 Lebanese Super Cup
 Lebanese Challenge Cup

References

External links
  (in Arabic)
 RSSSF

 
Elite
Recurring sporting events established in 1996
1990s establishments in Lebanon
Lebanese Premier League